Demi Hayes  (born 25 May 1998) is an Australian rugby sevens player.

Career
Hayes also plays touch rugby. She competed at the 2015 Commonwealth Youth Games and won gold. She made her debut for Australia at the 2016 Canada Women's Sevens against Brazil.

Hayes was named in the Australian squad for the Rugby sevens at the 2020 Summer Olympics. The team came second in the pool round but then lost to Fiji 14-12 in the quarterfinals.

Hayes won a gold medal with the Australian sevens team at the 2022 Commonwealth Games in Birmingham. She was a member of the Australian team that won the 2022 Sevens Rugby World Cup held in Cape Town, South Africa in September 2022.

Personal life 
Her partner Simon Kennewell has also played rugby sevens for Australia.

References

1998 births
Living people
Australian rugby union players
Australian female rugby sevens players
Olympic rugby sevens players of Australia
Rugby sevens players at the 2020 Summer Olympics
People from Mount Isa
Sportswomen from Queensland
Commonwealth Games medallists in rugby sevens
Commonwealth Games silver medallists for Australia
Rugby sevens players at the 2018 Commonwealth Games
Rugby sevens players at the 2022 Commonwealth Games
Medallists at the 2018 Commonwealth Games
Medallists at the 2022 Commonwealth Games